George Turnbull may refer to:

 George Turnbull (theologian) (1698–1748), Scottish theologian
 George Turnbull (soldier) (1729–1810), Scotland-born loyalist soldier in the American Revolutionary War
 George Turnbull (civil engineer) (1809–1889), civil engineer active in the UK and India
 George Stanley Turnbull (1882–1977), journalist, historian, and founder of the University of Oregon School of Journalism
 George Turnbull (businessman) (1926–1992), British car manufacturer, associated with British Leyland and Hyundai
 George Turnbull (footballer, born 1911) (1911–1996), English football forward, active 1930s
 George Turnbull (footballer, born 1927) (1927–2002), English football goalkeeper, active 1950s
 George Turnbull (rugby union) (1877–1970), Scottish rugby union player